Emmanuel "Manny" Roman (born August 1963) is a French financial executive. He is the chief executive officer (CEO) of PIMCO, a leading global investment management firm, based in Newport Beach, California.  In 2011, he was named by the Evening Standard as one of London's 1000 most influential people.

Early life and education
Roman grew up in Paris, the only child of the artists Philippe Roman and Véronique Jordan Roman. He earned a bachelor's degree in applied mathematics from the University of Paris IX Dauphine in 1985.  He later received an MBA in Finance from the University of Chicago Booth School of Business.

Career 
Roman has over 30 years of experience in the investment industry.   He joined Goldman Sachs, a global investment banking, securities and investment management firm, in 1987 where he spent the first 18 years of his career.   From 1996 to 2000 he served as co-head of Worldwide Equity Derivatives and was promoted to co-head of Worldwide Global Securities Services in 2000.

In 2005, Roman joined GLG Partners, a discretionary investment manager, as co-CEO and later played a key role in its listing in 2007.  In 2010, Roman instigated the sale of GLG to Man Group, one of the world's largest publicly traded alternative asset managers, and was named as president and chief operating officer.  Roman was added to Man Group's executive board in 2011 and named as successor to CEO Peter Clark the following year.

While at Man Group, Roman engineered a number of successful acquisitions including Connecticut-based Silvermine Capital, Boston-based quantitative equity manager Numeric Holdings and US fund of hedge funds Pine Grove.

In October 2016, Roman was named CEO of PIMCO, a global investment management firm headquartered in Newport Beach, California, replacing Douglas M. Hodge, who was CEO from 2014 to 2016.  As CEO, he serves on PIMCO's Executive Committee and has executive oversight of the firm's client and business areas, including broad strategy-setting and resource management.

PIMCO has over 2,800 employees working in 17 offices across the globe and $1.88 trillion in assets under management, as of 30 September 2019*. The company provides mutual funds, and other portfolio management and asset allocation products. Roman was awarded the Chicago Booth Distinguished Alumni Award in 2019 in recognition of outstanding professional achievement.

Personal life 
Roman has three daughters  and a son. In addition to collecting art and wine, Roman supports British football club, Arsenal.

He is President of The PIMCO Foundation and currently sits on the board of trustees for the Tate Foundation, and the University of Chicago and the Board of Directors for The Paris Review. He previously sat on the Board of Directors for Societe Generale and publisher Penguin Random House and served as a trustee of the Hedge Fund Standards Board as well as the Royal Marsden NHS Foundation Trust.

References

External links
Times article

Living people
1963 births
University of Chicago Booth School of Business alumni
Paris Dauphine University alumni
French businesspeople
Chief operating officers